Nikii Daas (born August 7, 1988) is an Indian model, actress and beauty queen.  She was crowned winner at the Gladrags beauty pageant and later won the title of "Miss Charming" while representing India at the international pageant Best Model of the World in Turkey.  Daas started to model professionally soon after that.  Daas has appeared in campaigns for brands like Spykar Jeans, Dolce & Gabbana, Globus, Donear suitings, Bombay Dyeing, Mag Wheels, Toyota Innova Car with Aamir Khan, Gold Souk (Dubai) – Mikura Pearls, and Paaneri Sarees. She has walked the ramp for designers like Satya Paul, Raymonds,  Shakir Shaikh, Marc Robinson, Prasad Bidapa, Elric D'souza, Lubna Adams, and Viveka Babajee.  She was featured in the Kingfisher Calendar. She made her acting debut in the 2013 kannada film Mandahasa.

References

External links
 

1988 births
Living people
Indian film actresses
Female models from Mumbai
Indian beauty pageant winners
Actresses from Mumbai